Taekwondo competitions at the 2015 European Games in Baku were held between 16 and 19 June 2015 at the Crystal Hall complex in Baku. The competition consisted of four weight events in each gender; a total of 8 medal events.

Qualification

Qualification will be based on the World Taekwondo Federation world ranking list on 31 March 2015, with 112 places being awarded through that system, 14 in each event. In addition, 8 'Universality' places, 1 per event, will be allocated in the individual competition to ensure a spread of nations can compete, and hosts Azerbaijan will also be entitled to one fighter per event.

National Olympic Committees, (NOCs) are restricted to a maximum of eight entries in total, and two entries in any single event.

2016 Summer Olympics

Taekwondo events that count towards Olympic ranking and thus qualification are given a 'G' ranking from G-1 to G-10, with G-10 being the most valuable. Taekwondo at the European Games will have a G-4 ranking event status; therefore ranking points towards qualification for the Rio 2016 Olympic Games will be available at the 2015 European Games.

Medalists

Men

Women

Medal table

Participating nations
A total of 127 athletes from 37 nations competed in taekwondo at the 2015 European Games.

References

 
Sports at the 2015 European Games
2015
European Games
Taekwondo in Azerbaijan